This list of speed skating records is an overview of the records currently held in various speed skating events, as ratified by the International Skating Union.

World records

Men

 * Seven skaters have a recorded a 3000m time below this world record on this irregularly competed distance, including Denis Yuskov, who recorded a 3000m time of 3:34.37 during a training race held on 2 November 2013. However, the race had a so-called 'quartet-start' (four riders on the track at the same time as opposed to the usual two), making it ineligible to be counted as a world record under Article 221(2)(i) of the rules of the International Skating Union. Several skaters have recorded 3000m split times below 3:37.28 during a 5000m race, including Sven Kramer as early as November 17, 2007, but split times do not count as world records either.
 ** The average speed for the team pursuit race was calculated using a distance of 3098,88 meters for the men's race. The skaters only utilize the inner lane and the lap distance is accordingly less than the 400 meters of a regular lap skated with one inner curve and one outer curve.
 *** unofficial world best (not recognized as a world record by ISU)

Women

 ** The average speed for the team pursuit race was calculated using a distance of 2324,16 meters for the women's race. The skaters only utilize the inner lane and the lap distance is accordingly less than the 400 meters of a regular lap skated with one inner curve and one outer curve.
 *** unofficial world best (not recognized as a world record by ISU)

Sea-level world bests
Salt Lake City and Calgary, where most of the current world records were set (see above), are at comparatively high altitudes (greater than 1 km above sea level). Performance is better at these high altitudes because the lower oxygen levels are compensated by the reduced air resistance. Skating statisticians therefore record separate lists of "sea-level world bests" for speed skating records that are set at (or close to) sea level, from which results in Salt Lake City and Calgary are excluded.

Men

Women

References

External links
 ISU world records
 ISU web site
 Speed skating statistics by Evert Stenlund

 
Sports world records
Speed skating-related lists